Xiangji Temple may refer to:

 Xiangji Temple (Shaanxi), in Xi'an, Shaanxi, China
 Xiangji Temple (Henan), in Ruzhou, Henan, China
 Xiangji Temple (Zhejiang), in Hangzhou, Zhejiang, China